Antonio García or Anthony Garcia may refer to:

Arts and entertainment
Antonio García Reinoso (1623–1677), Spanish painter
Antonio García Gutiérrez (1813–1884), Spanish Romantic dramatist
Antonio López García (born 1936), Spanish artist
Antonio García Vega (born 1954), Mexican artist

Politics
Antonio García Quejido (1856–1927), Spanish politician and trade unionist
Antonio García Barón (c. 1921–2008), Confederación Nacional del Trabajo member
Antonio García-Trevijano (1927–2018), Spanish political activist and author
Antonio García Torres (born 1943), Mexican politician
Antonio García (ELN commander) (born 1956), nom de guerre of Columbian ELN commander Eliécer Erlington Chamorro Acosta
Antonio García Conejo (born 1971), Mexican politician
António Garcia Pereira, Portuguese lawyer and politician

Sports

Association football
Antonio García (footballer, born 1940), Guatemalan football midfielder
Antonio García Ameijenda (born 1948), Spanish football manager and former midfielder
Antonio García Navajas (born 1958), Spanish football defender
Antonio García Prieto (born 1964), Salvadoran manager and former defender
Toño García (footballer, born 1989), Spanish football left-back
Antonio García Márquez (born 1989), Spanish football midfielder
Toni García (footballer, born 1991), Spanish football left-back
Toño García (footballer, born 1992), Mexican football defender

Other sports
Antonio María García (1868–1923), Cuban baseball catcher
Antonio García (sport shooter) (1909–1993), Mexican Olympic shooter
Antonio García (boxer) (born 1948), Spanish Olympic boxer
Antonio García Martínez (cyclist) (born 1956), Spanish cyclist
Antonio García (fencer) (born 1964), Spanish Olympic fencer
Antonio García (racing driver) (born 1980), Spanish racing driver
Antonio García Robledo (born 1984), Spanish handball player
Anthony García (born 1992), Puerto Rican baseball player
Antonio Garcia (American football) (born 1993), American football player

Others
Antonio Garcia-Bellido (born 1936), Spanish biologist
Antonio García López (criminal) (1943–1995), Puerto Rican criminal
Antonio García Padilla (born 1954), Puerto Rican academic
Anthony Garcia (terrorist), British terrorist arrested in Operation Crevice
Antonio García Martínez (author), American tech author and entrepreneur
Anthony Joseph Garcia (born 1973), American former doctor and convicted murderer

See also
Tony Garcia (disambiguation)
José Antonio García (disambiguation)